Aliabad-e Sofla (also Romanized as ‘Alīābād-e Soflá; also known as ‘Alīābād-e Kāmfīrūz-e Soflá and ‘Alīābād-e Pā’īn) is a village in Kamfiruz-e Jonubi Rural District, Kamfiruz District, Marvdasht County, Fars Province, Iran. At the 2006 census, its population was 1,184, in 264 families.

References 

Populated places in Marvdasht County